William D. McCoy (November 17, 1853May 14, 1893) was the United States Ambassador to Liberia from 1892 to 1893.

Early life
McCoy was born on November 17, 1853. McCoy was of African ancestry.

Career
McCoy was appointed by President Benjamin Harrison to the position of United States Ambassador to Liberia on January 11, 1892. The presentation of his credentials occurred on March 28, 1892. He remained in this position until his death.

Personal life
McCoy resided in Indiana.

Death
McCoy died on May 14, 1893, at post. He was interred at Crown Hill National Cemetery in Indianapolis, Indiana.

References

1853 births
1893 deaths
People from Indiana
Ambassadors of the United States to Liberia
African-American diplomats
Burials in Indiana
19th-century American diplomats
19th-century African-American people